Conrad Ulrich Sigmund Wille (5 April 1848 – 31 January 1925) was the General of the Swiss Army during the First World War. Inspired by the Prussian techniques that he had been able to observe at the time of his studies in Berlin, he attempted to impress the Swiss Army with a spirit based on instruction, discipline and technical control.

Nomination as general

At the dawn of the First World War, Switzerland confirmed its will to remain neutral and to avoid the conflicts which were going to set Europe ablaze.
However, Switzerland was divided between the German-speaking Swiss who favored the Central Powers, and the French and Italian-speaking Swiss whose opinions tended to support the Allied Powers.

As a Germanophile, close to Kaiser Wilhelm II, Wille benefitted from the pro-German current and the disparity within the Swiss Federal Council, which counted only one member from the French areas.

In 1914, upon the outbreak of war, a general mobilization of all military forces was issued. Wille, then a Colonel, was named General of Switzerland by the Federal Parliament on 8 August 1914 with 122 votes, against 63 votes for the other candidate, Theophil Sprecher von Bernegg. Von Bernegg would soon assume the rank of Chief of the General Staff and become a reliable partner of Wille's.
The opponents of the general described him as "militarist" whereas his partisans saw in him a chief ready to manage an army in mobilization thanks to his pedagogical talents. Wille decided to concentrate the bulk of his forces (238,000 men and 50,000 horses) close to the borders, particularly in Ajoie and Engadine.

Political issues

The mandate of Wille was rife with political problems. A scandal occurred in the French-speaking area of Switzerland when Wille proposed to the Federal Council on 20 July 1915, to enter the war on the side of the Central Powers. Thereafter, the "Colonels' Affair" in 1916 also had a great repercussion. Two Swiss colonels had given German and Austro-Hungarian diplomats specimens of the "Staff Gazette", a confidential journal, and Russian messages deciphered by Swiss cryptanalysts. The affair risked Swiss neutrality since it implied collusion with one of the belligerents. Wille decided to condemn the two colonels to 20 days' detention, an unsatisfactory sentence in the eyes of the pro-Allied party.

The confrontation between French-speaking Switzerland and German-speaking Switzerland widened. The Germanic newspapers supported the German actions in Belgium, whereas the French ones highlighted the resistance of the Allied forces against German troops.

The economic situation was poor and many strikes occurred, reaching their apogee with the Swiss general strike from 11 November to 14 November 1918. In a note dated 10 November 1918, Wille announced his concern for the rise of Bolshevism and the internal disorders to come in the country:

But he added that it was necessary to avoid violence:

Meanwhile, Wille had to manage the pandemic of the Spanish influenza, which affected the troops and the recruit schools. In order to combat the spread of the epidemic, enlistment of new recruits was delayed.

Personal life
Ulrich Wille's family was from La Sagne in the Canton of Neuchâtel. One of his ancestors settled in Hamburg and renamed the family name, "Vuille", to the more German "Wille". Ulrich's parents were journalist and politician François Wille (1811–1896) and novelist Eliza Wille-Sloman (1809–1893). They were liberals and, due to their disillusion by the failed German revolutions of 1848–49, they left Hamburg for Switzerland with their newborn son Ulrich. They settled in Meilen in the Canton of Zürich, where Ulrich grew up in Mariafeld, the family estate.

Wille was married to Countess Constanza Maria Amalia Clara von Bismarck (1851–1946), the daughter of Count Friedrich Wilhelm von Bismarck, a distant relative of Chancellor Otto von Bismarck.

His eldest son, also named Ulrich Wille, followed his father's footsteps in the military, ultimately becoming a Corps Commander. Wille Jr. also managed to keep his father's pro-German tendencies throughout his career, including during the Second World War. This would contribute to his tensions with the next Swiss General, Henri Guisan.

His daughter Renée Schwarzenbach-Wille, who was married to silk tycoon Alfred Schwarzenbach, was an Olympic horsewoman and prolific photographer. His granddaughter was the renowned author, traveler, and photographer Annemarie Schwarzenbach.

External links

References

1848 births
1925 deaths
People from Meilen District
Swiss generals
Military leaders of World War I
Military history of Switzerland
Swiss people of World War I
Academic staff of ETH Zurich
Ulrich